Pijnackeria is a genus of stick insects belonging to the tribe Gratidiini.

The species of this genus are found in Southern Europe.

Species:

Pijnackeria barbarae 
Pijnackeria hispanica 
Pijnackeria lelongi 
Pijnackeria lucianae 
Pijnackeria masettii 
Pijnackeria originis 
Pijnackeria recondita

References

Gratidiini
Phasmatodea genera